Victor "Vic" Terrell Spencer (born September 23, 1981), also known by his stage name, "Vic Spencer" is an American rapper from Chicago, Illinois. He has worked Sean Price, Ghostface Killah, Twista, Roc Marciano, Denmark Vessey, and many other artists/musicians. In 2017, he was featured on the Twista album Crook County, and Sean Price's album Imperius Rex. In April, 2018 he contributed a track on a Denmark Vessey album, produced by Earl Sweatshirt.

Discography

 2015 – The Cost of Victory 
 2016 – Dead
 2016 – Who the Fuck Is Chris Spencer?? (with Chris Crack)
 2016 – St. Gregory 2016 – The Ghost of Living (with Big Ghost Ltd.)
 2017 – VicTree EP
2018 – Spencer For Higher (with Sonnyjim)
2018 – A Smile Killed My Demons2018 – Duffle Of Gems 

2018 – Stupid
2019 –  Spencer For Higher 2 (with Sonnyjim)
2019 – Nothing IS Something (with Tree)
2019 – Bah Wounds2020 – Psychological Cheat Sheet''
2020 – No Shawn Skemps
2020 - Spencer For Higher 3
2020 – Rather Be a Real One
2021 – Psychological Cheat Sheet 2
2021 – Legend Laws of Power
2021 – Brainstem Factory
2021 – Spence for Higher 4
2022 – Still Here
2022 – Mudslide
2022 – Psychological Cheat Sheet 3
2022 - IMPACT(I Must Punch A Car Today)

References

American male rappers
Living people
1981 births
21st-century American rappers
21st-century American male musicians